The 2023 Oeiras Indoors II was a professional tennis tournament played on hard courts. It was the 2nd edition of the tournament which was part of the 2023 ATP Challenger Tour. It took place in Oeiras, Portugal from 9 to 14 January 2023.

Singles main-draw entrants

Seeds

 1 Rankings are as of 2 January 2023.

Other entrants
The following players received wildcards into the singles main draw:
  Jaime Faria
  Gonçalo Oliveira
  Pedro Sousa

The following player received entry into the singles main draw as a special exempt:
  Joris De Loore

The following players received entry from the qualifying draw:
  Gabriel Décamps
  Elmar Ejupovic
  Sebastian Fanselow
  Cem İlkel
  Mark Lajal
  Dino Prižmić

Champions

Singles

 Arthur Fils def.  Joris De Loore 6–1, 7–6(7–4).

Doubles

 Sander Arends /  David Pel def.  Patrik Niklas-Salminen /  Bart Stevens 6–3, 7–6(7–3).

References

2023 ATP Challenger Tour
2023 in Portuguese sport
January 2023 sports events in Portugal